Petals are modified leaves that surround the reproductive parts of flowers. They are often brightly colored or unusually shaped to attract pollinators. All of the petals of a flower are collectively known as the corolla. Petals are usually accompanied by another set of modified leaves called sepals, that collectively form the calyx and lie just beneath the corolla. The calyx and the corolla together make up the perianth, the non-reproductive portion of a flower. When the petals and sepals of a flower are difficult to distinguish, they are collectively called tepals. Examples of plants in which the term tepal is appropriate include genera such as Aloe and Tulipa. Conversely, genera such as Rosa and Phaseolus have well-distinguished sepals and petals. When the undifferentiated tepals resemble petals, they are referred to as "petaloid", as in petaloid monocots, orders of monocots with brightly colored tepals. Since they include Liliales, an alternative name is lilioid monocots.

Although petals are usually the most conspicuous parts of animal-pollinated flowers, wind-pollinated species, such as the grasses, either have very small petals or lack them entirely (apetalous).

Corolla

The collection of all petals in a flower is referred to as the corolla. The role of the corolla in plant evolution has been studied extensively since Charles Darwin postulated a theory of the origin of elongated corollae and corolla tubes.

A corolla of separate petals, without fusion of individual segments, is apopetalous. If the petals are free from one another in the corolla, the plant is polypetalous or choripetalous; while if the petals are at least partially fused, it is gamopetalous or sympetalous. In the case of fused tepals, the term is syntepalous. The corolla in some plants forms a tube.

Variations 

 

Petals can differ dramatically in different species.  The number of petals in a flower may hold clues to a plant's classification.  For example, flowers on eudicots (the largest group of dicots) most frequently have four or five petals while flowers on monocots have three or six petals, although there are many exceptions to this rule.

The petal whorl or corolla may be either radially or bilaterally symmetrical (see Symmetry in biology and Floral symmetry).  If all of the petals are essentially identical in size and shape, the flower is said to be regular or actinomorphic (meaning "ray-formed"). Many flowers are symmetrical in only one plane (i.e., symmetry is bilateral) and are termed irregular or zygomorphic (meaning "yoke-" or "pair-formed"). In irregular flowers, other floral parts may be modified from the regular form, but the petals show the greatest deviation from radial symmetry. Examples of zygomorphic flowers may be seen in orchids and members of the pea family.

In many plants of the aster family such as the sunflower, Helianthus annuus, the circumference of the flower head is composed of ray florets.  Each ray floret is anatomically an individual flower with a single large petal.  Florets in the center of the disc typically have no or very reduced petals. In some plants such as Narcissus the lower part of the petals or tepals are fused to form a floral cup (hypanthium) above the ovary, and from which the petals proper extend.

Petal often consists of two parts: the upper, broad part, similar to leaf blade, also called the blade and the lower part, narrow, similar to leaf petiole, called the claw, separated from each other at the limb. Claws are developed in petals of some flowers of the family Brassicaceae, such as Erysimum cheiri.

The inception and further development of petals show a great variety of patterns. Petals of different species of plants vary greatly in color or color pattern, both in visible light and in ultraviolet. Such patterns often function as guides to pollinators and are variously known as nectar guides, pollen guides, and floral guides.

Genetics
The genetics behind the formation of petals, in accordance with the ABC model of flower development, are that sepals, petals, stamens, and carpels are modified versions of each other.  It appears that the mechanisms to form petals evolved very few times (perhaps only once), rather than evolving repeatedly from stamens.

Significance of pollination
Pollination is an important step in the sexual reproduction of higher plants.  Pollen is produced by the male flower or by the male organs of hermaphroditic flowers.

Pollen does not move on its own and thus requires wind or animal pollinators to disperse the pollen to the stigma of the same or nearby flowers. However, pollinators are rather selective in determining the flowers they choose to pollinate. This develops competition between flowers and as a result flowers must provide incentives to appeal to pollinators (unless the flower self-pollinates or is involved in wind pollination). Petals play a major role in competing to attract pollinators. Henceforth pollination dispersal could occur and the survival of many species of flowers could prolong.

Functions and purposes
Petals have various functions and purposes depending on the type of plant. In general, petals operate to protect some parts of the flower and attract/repel specific pollinators.

Function
This is where the positioning of the flower petals are located on the flower is the corolla e.g. the buttercup having shiny yellow flower petals which contain guidelines amongst the petals in aiding the pollinator towards the nectar. Pollinators have the ability to determine specific flowers they wish to pollinate. Using incentives flowers draw pollinators and set up a mutual relation between each other in which case the pollinators will remember to always guard and pollinate these flowers (unless incentives are not consistently met and competition prevails).

Scent
The petals could produce different scents to allure desirable pollinators or repel undesirable pollinators. Some flowers will also mimic the scents produced by materials such as decaying meat, to attract pollinators to them.

Color
Various color traits are used by different petals that could attract pollinators that have poor smelling abilities, or that only come out at certain parts of the day. Some flowers can change the color of their petals as a signal to mutual pollinators to approach or keep away.

Shape and size
Furthermore, the shape and size of the flower/petals are important in selecting the type of pollinators they need. For example, large petals and flowers will attract pollinators at a large distance or that are large themselves.
Collectively the scent, color, and shape of petals all play a role in attracting/repelling specific pollinators and providing suitable conditions for pollinating. Some pollinators include insects, birds, bats, and wind.
In some petals, a distinction can be made between a lower narrowed, stalk-like basal part referred to as the claw, and a wider distal part referred to as the blade (or limb). Often the claw and blade are at an angle with one another.

Types of pollination

Wind pollination

Wind-pollinated flowers often have small, dull petals and produce little or no scent. Some of these flowers will often have no petals at all. Flowers that depend on wind pollination will produce large amounts of pollen because most of the pollen scattered by the wind tends to not reach other flowers.

Attracting insects
Flowers have various regulatory mechanisms to attract insects. One such helpful mechanism is the use of color guiding marks. Insects such as the bee or butterfly can see the ultraviolet marks which are contained on these flowers, acting as an attractive mechanism which is not visible towards the human eye. Many flowers contain a variety of shapes acting to aid with the landing of the visiting insect and also influence the insect to brush against anthers and stigmas (parts of the flower). One such example of a flower is the pohutukawa (Metrosideros excelsa) which acts to regulate color in a different way. The pohutukawa contains small petals also having bright large red clusters of stamens.
Another attractive mechanism for flowers is the use of scents which are highly attractive to humans. One such example is the rose. On the other hand, some flowers produce the smell of rotting meat and are attractive to insects such as flies. Darkness is another factor that flowers have adapted to as nighttime conditions limit vision and color-perception. Fragrancy can be especially useful for flowers that are pollinated at night by moths and other flying insects.

Attracting birds
Flowers are also pollinated by birds and must be large and colorful to be visible against natural scenery. In New Zealand, such bird–pollinated native plants include: kowhai (Sophora species), flax (Phormium tenax) and kaka beak (Clianthus puniceus). Flowers adapt the mechanism on their petals to change color in acting as a communicative mechanism for the bird to visit. An example is the tree fuchsia (Fuchsia excorticata) which are green when needing to be pollinated and turn red for the birds to stop coming and pollinating the flower.

Bat-pollinated flowers
Flowers can be pollinated by short-tailed bats. An example of this is the dactylanthus (Dactylanthus taylorii). This plant has its home under the ground acting the role of a parasite on the roots of forest trees. The dactylanthus has only its flowers pointing to the surface and the flowers lack color but have the advantage of containing much nectar and a strong scent. These act as a useful mechanism in attracting the bat.

References

Bibliography
 

Plant morphology
Plant reproductive system
Pollination